Krishna Kalyani (born 26 June 1979) is an Indian politician. He is also an industrialist by profession. He is the incumbent member of West Bengal Legislative Assembly from Raiganj constituency from 2021.

Political career 
Krishna Kalyani joined Bharatiya Janata Party on 24 January 2021. He represents the Raiganj Vidhan Sabha constituency which he won in 2021 as a Bharatiya Janata Party (BJP) candidate. He announced his resignation from BJP on 1 October 2021 and joined All India Trinamool Congress on 27 October 2021.

See also 

 West Bengal Legislative Assembly
 2021 West Bengal Legislative Assembly election
 Bharatiya Janata Party, West Bengal

References 

Living people
21st-century Indian politicians
People from Uttar Dinajpur district
Bharatiya Janata Party politicians from West Bengal
West Bengal MLAs 2021–2026
1979 births
Trinamool Congress politicians